Horrie Miller (1882-1967) was an Australian rugby league footballer in the New South Wales Rugby Football League premiership.

Playing career
Miller was a champion runner who was rated the fastest runner in the league's inaugural season.  He headed the League's try-scoring list in that first season - he scored a hat trick of tries in that year's semi-final and followed that up with a further two in the final. He was also the League's top point scorer in season 1908. His only representative match came in that first year when he was selected to represent Sydney in a match against a touring New Zealand Maori side.

Post playing
The wing three-quarter also served as Eastern Suburbs secretary in the club's first season. In addition, that year Miller was appointed secretary of the New South Wales Rugby Football League on a temporary basis, following the dismissal of J J Giltinan. The position became permanent in 1914 and Miller served in that role until 1946. 
He was awarded Life Membership of the New South Wales Rugby League in 1914.

During the 1948 season, the former league secretary unsuccessfully attempted to establish a rebel night competition.

Miller is remembered as the Sydney Roosters 15th player.

Miller is credited with coining the phrase "The Greatest Game of All".

References

External links
 The Encyclopedia Of Rugby League Players; Alan Whiticker & Glen Hudson
 History Of The New South Wales Rugby League Finals; Steve Haddan
 The Story Of Australian Rugby League; Gary Lester

1882 births
Sydney Roosters players
Australian rugby league players
1967 deaths
Australian rugby league administrators
Rugby league wingers
Date of birth missing
Rugby league players from Sydney